Kemal may refer to:

People
 Mustafa Kemal Atatürk, a Turkish politician and the first president of Turkey
 Kemal (name), a common Turkish name

Places
 Kemalpaşa, İzmir Province, Turkey
 Mustafakemalpaşa, Bursa Province, Turkey

See also
"Kemal", a Greek song by Manos Hatzidakis and Nikos Gatsos